This is a list of the mammal species recorded in Papua New Guinea. There are 244 mammal species in Papua New Guinea, of which seven are critically endangered, twelve are endangered and forty are vulnerable.

Abbreviations
The following tags are used to highlight each species' conservation status as assessed by the International Union for Conservation of Nature:

Some species were assessed using an earlier set of criteria. Species assessed using this system have the following instead of near threatened and least concern categories:

Subclass: Theria

Infraclass: Eutheria

Order: Sirenia (manatees and dugongs)

Sirenia is an order of fully aquatic, herbivorous mammals that inhabit rivers, estuaries, coastal marine waters, swamps, and marine wetlands. All four species are endangered.

Family: Dugongidae
Genus: Dugong
 Dugong, Dugong dugon VU

Order: Rodentia (rodents)

Rodents make up the largest order of mammals, with over 40% of mammalian species. They have two incisors in the upper and lower jaw which grow continually and must be kept short by gnawing.

Suborder: Sciurognathi
Family: Muridae (mice, rats, voles, gerbils, hamsters, etc.)
Subfamily: Murinae
Genus: Anisomys
 Squirrel-toothed rat, Anisomys imitator LR/lc
Genus: Chiruromys
 Greater tree mouse, Chiruromys forbesi LR/lc
 Lamia, Chiruromys lamia LR/lc
 Lesser tree mouse, Chiruromys vates LR/lc
Genus: Coccymys
 Rümmler's brush mouse, Coccymys ruemmleri LR/lc
Genus: Conilurus
 Brush-tailed rabbit rat, Conilurus penicillatus LR/lc
Genus: Crossomys
 Earless water rat, Crossomys moncktoni LR/lc
Genus: Hydromys
 Water rat, Hydromys chrysogaster LR/lc
 Western water rat, Hydromys hussoni LR/nt
 New Britain water rat, Hydromys neobrittanicus VU
Genus: Baiyankamys
 Mountain water rat, Baiyankamys habbema LR/nt
 Shaw Mayer's water rat, Baiyankamys shawmayeri LR/nt
Genus: Hyomys
 Western white-eared giant rat, Hyomys dammermani LR/lc
 Eastern white-eared giant rat, Hyomys goliath LR/lc
Genus: Leptomys
 Long-footed water rat, Leptomys elegans CR
 Ernst Mayr's water rat, Leptomys ernstmayri LR/lc
 Fly River water rat, Leptomys signatus CR
Genus: Lorentzimys
 New Guinean jumping mouse, Lorentzimys nouhuysi LR/lc
Genus: Macruromys
 Eastern small-toothed rat, Macruromys major EN
Genus: Mallomys
 De Vis's woolly rat, Mallomys aroaensis LR/lc
 Subalpine woolly rat, Mallomys istapantap LR/nt
 Rothschild's woolly rat, Mallomys rothschildi LR/lc
Genus: Mammelomys
 Large-scaled mosaic-tailed rat, Mammelomys lanosus LR/lc
 Large mosaic-tailed rat, Mammelomys rattoides LR/lc
Genus: Melomys
 Bougainville mosaic-tailed rat, Melomys bougainville LR/nt
 Grassland mosaic-tailed rat, Melomys burtoni LR/lc
 Red-bellied mosaic-tailed rat, Melomys fellowsi VU
 Slender mosaic-tailed rat, Melomys gracilis LR/lc
 White-bellied mosaic-tailed rat, Melomys leucogaster LR/lc
 Long-nosed mosaic-tailed rat, Melomys levipes LR/lc
 Lorentz's mosaic-tailed rat, Melomys lorentzii LR/lc
 Thomas's mosaic-tailed rat, Melomys mollis LR/lc
 Moncton's mosaic-tailed rat, Melomys moncktoni LR/lc
 Lowland mosaic-tailed rat, Melomys platyops LR/lc
 Mountain mosaic-tailed rat, Melomys rubex LR/lc
 Black-tailed mosaic-tailed rat, Melomys rufescens LR/lc
Genus: Microhydromys
 Musser's shrew mouse, Microhydromys musseri LR/lc
 Groove-toothed shrew mouse, Microhydromys richardsoni LR/nt
Genus: Parahydromys
 New Guinea waterside rat, Parahydromys asper LR/lc
Genus: Paraleptomys
 Northern water rat, Paraleptomys rufilatus LR/lc
 Short-haired water rat, Paraleptomys wilhelmina VU
Genus: Pogonomelomys
 Grey pogonomelomys, Pogonomelomys brassi LC
 Lowland brush mouse, Pogonomelomys bruijni CR
 Shaw Mayer's brush mouse, Pogonomelomys mayeri LR/lc
 Highland brush mouse, Pogonomelomys sevia LR/lc
Genus: Pogonomys
 Champion's tree mouse, Pogonomys championi VU
 Large tree mouse, Pogonomys loriae LR/lc
 Chestnut tree mouse, Pogonomys macrourus LR/lc
 Gray-bellied tree mouse, Pogonomys sylvestris LR/lc
Genus: Pseudohydromys
 One-toothed shrew-mouse, Pseudohydromys ellermani VU
 Mottled-tailed shrew mouse, Pseudohydromys fuscus VU
 German's one-toothed moss mouse, Pseudohydromys germani
 Eastern shrew mouse, Pseudohydromys murinus CR
 Western shrew mouse, Pseudohydromys occidentalis VU
Genus: Pseudomys
 Little native mouse, Pseudomys delicatulus LR/nt
Genus: Rattus
 Polynesian rat, Rattus exulans LR/lc
 Giluwe rat, Rattus giluwensis LR/nt
 Cape York rat, Rattus leucopus LR/lc
 Eastern rat, Rattus mordax LR/lc
 New Guinean rat, Rattus novaeguineae LR/lc
 Large New Guinea spiny rat, Rattus praetor LR/lc
 Dusky field rat, Rattus sordidus LR/nt
 Stein's rat, Rattus steini LR/lc
Genus: Solomys
 Poncelet's naked-tailed rat, Solomys ponceleti EN
 Bougainville naked-tailed rat, Solomys salebrosus LR/nt
 Isabel naked-tailed rat, Solomys sapientis VU
Genus: Stenomys
 Moss-forest rat, Stenomys niobe LR/lc
 Van Deusen's rat, Stenomys vandeuseni EN
 Slender rat, Stenomys verecundus LR/lc
Genus: Uromys
 Giant naked-tailed rat, Uromys anak LR/nt
 Giant white-tailed rat, Uromys caudimaculatus LR/lc
 Bismarck giant rat, Uromys neobritanicus LR/lc
Genus: Xenuromys
 Rock-dwelling rat, Xenuromys barbatus LR/nt
Genus: Xeromys
 False water rat, Xeromys myoides VU

Order: Chiroptera (bats)

The bats' most distinguishing feature is that their forelimbs are developed as wings, making them the only mammals capable of flight. Bat species account for about 20% of all mammals.

Family: Pteropodidae (flying foxes, Old World fruit bats)
Subfamily: Pteropodinae
Genus: Aproteles
 Bulmer's fruit bat, Aproteles bulmerae CR
Genus: Dobsonia
 Lesser naked-backed fruit bat, Dobsonia minor LR/nt
 Moluccan naked-backed fruit bat, Dobsonia moluccensis LR/lc
 Panniet naked-backed fruit bat, Dobsonia pannietensis LR/lc
 New Britain naked-backed fruit bat, Dobsonia praedatrix LR/nt
Genus: Nyctimene
 Broad-striped tube-nosed fruit bat, Nyctimene aello LR/nt
 Common tube-nosed fruit bat, Nyctimene albiventer LR/lc
 Pallas's tube-nosed fruit bat, Nyctimene cephalotes LR/lc
 Mountain tube-nosed fruit bat, Nyctimene certans LR/nt
 Round-eared tube-nosed fruit bat, Nyctimene cyclotis LR/nt
 Dragon tube-nosed fruit bat, Nyctimene draconilla VU
 Island tube-nosed fruit bat, Nyctimene major LR/lc
 Demonic tube-nosed fruit bat, Nyctimene masalai VU
 Umboi tube-nosed fruit bat, Nyctimene vizcaccia LR/lc
Genus: Paranyctimene
 Unstriped tube-nosed bat, Paranyctimene raptor LR/nt
Genus: Pteralopex
 Bougainville monkey-faced bat, Pteralopex anceps CR
Genus: Pteropus
 Admiralty flying-fox, Pteropus admiralitatum LR/lc
 Black flying-fox, Pteropus alecto LR/lc
 Spectacled flying-fox, Pteropus conspicillatus LR/lc
 Gilliard's flying-fox, Pteropus gilliardorum VU
 Small flying-fox, Pteropus hypomelanus LR/lc
 Big-eared flying fox, Pteropus macrotis LR/lc
 Lesser flying-fox, Pteropus mahaganus VU
 Bismarck flying-fox, Pteropus neohibernicus LR/lc
 Little red flying-fox, Pteropus scapulatus LR/lc
 Temminck's flying fox, Pteropus temminckii LR/nt
 Insular flying-fox, Pteropus tonganus LR/lc
Genus: Rousettus
 Geoffroy's rousette, Rousettus amplexicaudatus LR/lc
Subfamily: Macroglossinae
Genus: Macroglossus
 Long-tongued nectar bat, Macroglossus minimus LR/lc
Genus: Melonycteris
 Black-bellied fruit bat, Melonycteris melanops LR/lc
Genus: Syconycteris
 Common blossom-bat, Syconycteris australis LR/lc
 Moss-forest blossom bat, Syconycteris hobbit VU
Family: Vespertilionidae
Subfamily: Kerivoulinae
Genus: Kerivoula
 St. Aignan's trumpet-eared bat, Kerivoula agnella VU
 Fly River trumpet-eared bat, Kerivoula muscina VU
 Bismarck's trumpet-eared bat, Kerivoula myrella VU
Genus: Phoniscus
 Golden-tipped bat, Phoniscus papuensis LR/lc
Subfamily: Myotinae
Genus: Myotis
 Large-footed bat, Myotis adversus LR/lc
 Peters's myotis, Myotis atra LR/lc
 Whiskered myotis, Myotis muricola LR/lc
Subfamily: Vespertilioninae
Genus: Chalinolobus
 Hoary wattled bat, Chalinolobus nigrogriseus LR/lc
Genus: Nycticeius
 Northern broad-nosed bat, Nycticeius sanborni LR/lc
Genus: Nyctophilus
 Eastern long-eared bat, Nyctophilus bifax LR/lc
 Gould's long-eared bat, Nyctophilus gouldi LR/lc
 Small-toothed long-eared bat, Nyctophilus microdon VU
 New Guinea long-eared bat, Nyctophilus microtis LR/lc
 Greater long-eared bat, Nyctophilus timoriensis VU
Genus: Pharotis
 New Guinea big-eared bat, Pharotis imogene CR
Genus: Philetor
 Rohu's bat, Philetor brachypterus LR/lc
Genus: Pipistrellus
 Angulate pipistrelle, Pipistrellus angulatus LR/lc
 Greater Papuan pipistrelle, Pipistrellus collinus LR/lc
 Lesser Papuan pipistrelle, Pipistrellus papuanus LR/nt
 Watt's pipistrelle, Pipistrellus wattsi LR/nt
Subfamily: Murininae
Genus: Murina
 Flores tube-nosed bat, Murina florium LR/lc
Subfamily: Miniopterinae
Genus: Miniopterus
 Western bent-winged bat, Miniopterus magnater LR/lc
 Intermediate long-fingered bat, Miniopterus medius LR/lc
 Schreibers' long-fingered bat, Miniopterus schreibersii LC
 Great bent-winged bat, Miniopterus tristis LR/lc
Family: Molossidae
Genus: Chaerephon
 Northern freetail bat, Chaerephon jobensis LR/lc
Genus: Mormopterus
 Beccari's mastiff bat, Mormopterus beccarii LR/lc
 Southern free-tailed bat, Mormopterus planiceps LR/lc
Genus: Otomops
 Big-eared mastiff bat, Otomops papuensis VU
 Mantled mastiff bat, Otomops secundus VU
Genus: Tadarida
 White-striped free-tailed bat, Tadarida australis LR/nt
Family: Emballonuridae
Genus: Emballonura
 Beccari's sheath-tailed bat, Emballonura beccarii LR/lc
 Large-eared sheath-tailed bat, Emballonura dianae VU
 New Guinea sheath-tailed bat, Emballonura furax VU
 Raffray's sheath-tailed bat, Emballonura raffrayana LR/nt
 Seri's sheathtail-bat, Emballonura serii DD
Genus: Mosia
 Dark sheath-tailed bat, Mosia nigrescens LR/lc
Genus: Saccolaimus
 Yellow-bellied pouched bat, Saccolaimus flaviventris LR/nt
 Troughton's pouched bat, Saccolaimus mixtus VU
 Naked-rumped pouched bat, Saccolaimus saccolaimus LR/lc
Genus: Taphozous
 Coastal tomb bat, Taphozous australis LR/nt
Family: Rhinolophidae
Subfamily: Rhinolophinae
Genus: Rhinolophus
 Arcuate horseshoe bat, Rhinolophus arcuatus LR/lc
 Broad-eared horseshoe bat, Rhinolophus euryotis LR/lc
 Smaller horseshoe bat, Rhinolophus megaphyllus LR/lc
 Large-eared horseshoe bat, Rhinolophus philippinensis LR/nt
Subfamily: Hipposiderinae
Genus: Anthops
 Flower-faced bat, Anthops ornatus VU
Genus: Aselliscus
 Temminck's trident bat, Aselliscus tricuspidatus LR/lc
Genus: Hipposideros
 Dusky roundleaf bat, Hipposideros ater LR/lc
 Spurred roundleaf bat, Hipposideros calcaratus LR/lc
 Telefomin roundleaf bat, Hipposideros corynophyllus VU
 Fierce roundleaf bat, Hipposideros dinops LR/nt
 Hill's roundleaf bat, Hipposideros edwardshilli LR/nt
 Maggie Taylor's roundleaf bat, Hipposideros maggietaylorae LR/lc
 Fly River roundleaf bat, Hipposideros muscinus VU
 Semon's roundleaf bat, Hipposideros semoni LR/nt
 Wollaston's roundleaf bat, Hipposideros wollastoni LR/nt

Order: Cetacea (whales)

The order Cetacea includes whales, dolphins and porpoises. They are the mammals most fully adapted to aquatic life with a spindle-shaped nearly hairless body, protected by a thick layer of blubber, and forelimbs and tail modified to provide propulsion underwater.

Suborder: Odontoceti
Superfamily: Platanistoidea
Family: Kogiidae
Genus: Kogia
 Pygmy sperm whale, Kogia breviceps LR/lc
 Dwarf sperm whale, Kogia sima LR/lc
Family: Ziphidae
Subfamily: Hyperoodontinae
Genus: Mesoplodon
 Blainville's beaked whale, Mesoplodon densirostris DD
 Ginkgo-toothed beaked whale, Mesoplodon ginkgodens DD
Family: Delphinidae (marine dolphins)
Genus: Steno
 Rough-toothed dolphin, Steno bredanensis DD
Genus: Sousa
 Australian humpback dolphin, Sousa saulensis DD
Genus: Stenella
 Pantropical spotted dolphin, Stenella attenuata LR/cd
 Spinner dolphin, Stenella longirostris LR/cd
Genus: Lagenodelphis
 Fraser's dolphin, Lagenodelphis hosei DD
Genus: Grampus
 Risso's dolphin, Grampus griseus DD
Genus: Peponocephala
 Melon-headed whale, Peponocephala electra LR/lc
Genus: Feresa
 Pygmy killer whale, Feresa attenuata DD
Genus: Orcinus
 Orca or killer whale, Orcinus orca LR/cd
Genus: Orcaella
 Irrawaddy dolphin, Orcaella heinsohniDD

Infraclass: Metatheria

Order: Dasyuromorphia (marsupial carnivores)

The order Dasyuromorphia comprises most of the carnivorous marsupials, including quolls, dunnarts, the numbat, the Tasmanian devil, and the recently extinct thylacine.

Family: Dasyuridae (flesh-eating marsupials)
Subfamily: Dasyurinae
Tribe: Dasyurini
Genus: Dasyurus
 New Guinean quoll, D. albopunctatus 
 Bronze quoll, D. spartacus 
Genus: Myoictis
 Three-striped dasyure, Myoictis melas LC
Genus: Neophascogale
 Speckled dasyure, Neophascogale lorentzi LC
Genus: Phascolosorex
 Narrow-striped marsupial shrew, Phascolosorex dorsalis LC
Tribe: Phascogalini
 Genus Micromurexia
 Habbema dasyure, Micromurexia habbema LC
 Genus Murexechinus
 Black-tailed dasyure, Murexechinus melanurus LC
Genus: Murexia
 Short-furred dasyure, Murexia longicaudata LC
 Genus Paramurexia
 Broad-striped dasyure, Paramurexia rothschildi VU
 Genus Phascomurexia
 Long-nosed dasyure, Phascomurexia naso LC
Subfamily: Sminthopsinae
Tribe: Sminthopsini
Genus: Sminthopsis
 Chestnut dunnart, Sminthopsis archeri DD
 Red-cheeked dunnart, Sminthopsis virginiae LC
Tribe: Planigalini
Genus: Planigale
 New Guinean planigale, Planigale novaeguineae LC

Order: Peramelemorphia (bandicoots and bilbies)

Peramelemorphia includes the bandicoots and bilbies: it equates approximately to the mainstream of marsupial omnivores. All members of the order are endemic to the twin land masses of Australia-New Guinea and most have the characteristic bandicoot shape: a plump, arch-backed body with a long, delicately tapering snout, very large upright ears, relatively long, thin legs, and a thin tail.

Family: Peramelidae
Subfamily: Peramelinae
Genus: Isoodon
 Northern brown bandicoot, Isoodon macrourus LC
Subfamily: Peroryctinae
Genus: Peroryctes
 Giant bandicoot, Peroryctes broadbenti EN
 Raffray's bandicoot, Peroryctes raffrayana LC
Subfamily: Echymiperinae
Genus: Echymipera
 Clara’s echymipera, Echymipera clara LC
 David's echymipera, Echymipera davidi EN
 Menzies' echymipera, Echymipera echinista DD
 Common spiny bandicoot, Echymipera kalubu LC
 Long-nosed echymipera, Echymipera rufescens LC
Genus: Microperoryctes
 Striped bandicoot, Microperoryctes longicauda LC
 Papuan bandicoot, Microperoryctes papuensis LC

Order: Diprotodontia (kangaroos, wallabies, wombats and allies)

Diprotodontia is a large order of about 120 marsupial mammals including the kangaroos, wallabies, possums, koala, wombats, and many others. They are restricted to Australasia.

Suborder: Phalangeriformes
Superfamily: Phalangeroidea
Family: Burramyidae
Genus: Cercartetus
 Long-tailed pygmy possum, Cercartetus caudatus LC
Family: Phalangeridae (phalangers)
Subfamily: Phalangerinae
Tribe: Phalangerini
Genus: Phalanger
 Mountain cuscus, Phalanger carmelitae LC
 Ground cuscus, Phalanger gymnotis LC
 Southern common cuscus, Phalanger intercastellanus LC
 Woodlark cuscus, Phalanger lullulae EN
 Telefomin cuscus, Phalanger matanim CR
 Southern common cuscus, Phalanger orientalis LC
 Silky cuscus, Phalanger sericeus LC
 Stein's cuscus, Phalanger vestitus LC
Genus: Spilocuscus
 Admiralty Island cuscus, Spilocuscus kraemeri NT
 Common spotted cuscus, Spilocuscus maculatus LC
 Black-spotted cuscus, Spilocuscus rufoniger CR
Superfamily: Petauroidea
Family: Pseudocheiridae
Subfamily: Pseudocheirinae
Genus: Pseudochirulus
 Lowland ringtail, Pseudochirulus canescens LC
 Painted ringtail, Pseudochirulus forbesi LC
 Pygmy ringtail, Pseudochirulus mayeri LC
Subfamily: Pseudochiropsinae
Genus: Pseudochirops
 D'Albertis' ringtail possum, Pseudochirops albertisii NT
 Lowland ringtail possum, Pseudochirulus canescens LC
 Plush-coated ringtail possum, Pseudochirops corinnae NT
 Coppery ringtail possum, Pseudochirops cupreus LC
 Masked ringtail possum, Pseudochirulus larvatus LC
 Pygmy ringtail possum, Pseudochirulus mayeri LC
Family: Petauridae (gliders, Leadbeater's or striped possums)
Genus: Dactylopsila
 Great-tailed triok, Dactylopsila megalura LC
 Long-fingered triok, Dactylopsila palpator LC
 Tate's triok, Dactylopsila tatei EN
 Striped possum, Dactylopsila trivirgata LC
Genus: Petaurus
 Northern glider, Petaurus abidi CR
 Krefft's glider, Petaurus notatus NE
Family: Acrobatidae
Genus: Distoechurus
 Feathertail possum, Distoechurus pennatus LC
Suborder: Macropodiformes
Family: Macropodidae (kangaroos and wallabies)
Subfamily: Macropodinae
Genus: Dendrolagus
 Doria's tree-kangaroo, Dendrolagus dorianus VU
 Goodfellow's tree-kangaroo, Dendrolagus goodfellowi EN
 Grizzled tree kangaroo, Dendrolagus inustus VU
 Matschie's tree-kangaroo, Dendrolagus matschiei EN
 Tenkile, Dendrolagus scottae CR
 Lowlands tree-kangaroo, Dendrolagus spadix LC
Genus: Dorcopsis
 Black dorcopsis, Dorcopsis atrata CR
 White-striped dorcopsis, Dorcopsis hageni LC
 Gray dorcopsis, Dorcopsis luctuosa VU
Genus: Dorcopsulus
 Macleay's dorcopsis, Dorcopsulus macleayi LC
 Small dorcopsis, Dorcopsulus vanheurni NT
Genus: Lagorchestes
 Spectacled hare-wallaby, Lagorchestes conspicillatus LC
Genus: Macropus
 Agile wallaby, Macropus agilis LC
Genus: Thylogale
 Brown's pademelon, Thylogale browni VU
 Dusky pademelon, Thylogale brunii VU
 Calaby's pademelon, Thylogale calabyi EN
 Red-legged pademelon, Thylogale stigmatica LC

Subclass: Protheria

Order: Monotremata (monotremes)

Monotremes are mammals that lay eggs instead of giving birth to live young. Momotremata comprises the platypus and echidnas.

Family: Tachyglossidae
Genus: Tachyglossus
 Short-beaked echidna, Tachyglossus aculeatus LC
Genus: Zaglossus
 Eastern long-beaked echidna, Zaglossus bartoni CR

See also
Fauna of New Guinea
List of chordate orders
Lists of mammals by region
List of prehistoric mammals
Mammal classification
List of mammals described in the 2000s

Notes

References
 

 
Papua New Guinea
Mammals
Papua New Guinea